Richard Hutton may refer to:

 Richard Hutton (died 1604), MP for Southwark
 Richard Hutton (cricketer) (born 1942), former English cricketer
 Richard Holt Hutton (1826–1897), English writer and theologian
 Sir Richard Hutton (1560–1639), Yorkshire landowner and lawyer 
 Sir Richard Hutton, the younger (1594–1645), 17th-century MP for Knaresborough and landowner